Weimar Alfonso Roldán Ortíz (born May 17, 1985 in Medellín) is a Colombian professional road and track cyclist, who currently rides for UCI Continental team .

Major results

2005
 1st  Time trial, Pan American Under-23 Road Championships
2006
 1st Stage 6 Vuelta a Colombia Sub-23
 1st Stage 1 Clasica de Guarné
2007
 9th Time trial, Pan American Road Championships
2008
 1st Prologue Vuelta al Valle del Cauca
 1st Stage 3 Clasica del Meta
 1st Stage 1 Clásica Nacional Marco Fidel Suárez
2009
 1st Stage 5 Vuelta del Huila
 1st Prologue (TTT) Vuelta a Colombia
 1st Stage 11 Vuelta a Venezuela
 1st Stage 3 Clásica Nacional Marco Fidel Suárez
 Gran Caracol de Pista
1st Stages 8 & 9
 1st Team pursuit, 2009–10 UCI Track Cycling World Cup Classics, Cali (with Juan Arango, Edwin Ávila and Arles Castro)
2010
 Central American and Caribbean Games
1st Team pursuit (with Juan Arango, Edwin Ávila and Arles Castro)
1st Madison (with Juan Arango)
 1st Prologue (TTT) Vuelta al Valle del Cauca
 Clásico RCN
1st Sprints classification
1st Stage 1 (TTT)
 1st Stage 1 Clasico El Colombiano
 2nd Team pursuit, 2010–11 UCI Track Cycling World Cup Classics, Cali (with Juan Arango, Edwin Ávila and Arles Castro)
 3rd Overall Clásica Rionegro con Futuro-Aguas de Rionegro
1st Stage 1
2011
 1st  Road race, National Road Championships
 1st Team pursuit, Pan American Games (with Juan Arango, Edwin Ávila and Arles Castro)
 1st Madison, 2011–12 UCI Track Cycling World Cup, Cali (with Juan Arango)
 1st Stage 2 Clásica Rionegro con Futuro-Aguas de Rionegro
2012
 1st Team pursuit, 2012–13 UCI Track Cycling World Cup, Cali (with Juan Arango, Edwin Ávila and Arles Castro)
 1st Stage 5 Clásica Nacional Marco Fidel Suárez
 1st Stage 1 Clasico El Colombiano
2013
 1st Stage 3 Clásica Rionegro con Futuro-Aguas de Rionegro
 1st Stage 1 Clásica Nacional Ciudad de Anapoima
 1st Stage 1 Tour do Rio
 4th Overall Vuelta al Valle del Cauca
2014
 Vuelta a Colombia
1st Stages 1 (TTT) & 3
 5th Road race, Pan American Road Championships
2015
 1st Stage 1 (TTT) Vuelta a Colombia
 Tour do Rio
1st Points classification
1st Stage 3
2016
 1st  Team time trial, National Road Championships
2017
 1st Stage 1 Vuelta a Asturias
 10th Overall Tour of Ankara
2018
 7th Winston-Salem Cycling Classic
2019
 1st Stage 1 (TTT) Tour of Qinghai Lake

References

External links
 
 

1985 births
Living people
Colombian male cyclists
Cyclists at the 2011 Pan American Games
Sportspeople from Medellín
Vuelta a Colombia stage winners
Vuelta a Venezuela stage winners
Cyclists at the 2012 Summer Olympics
Olympic cyclists of Colombia
Pan American Games medalists in cycling
Pan American Games gold medalists for Colombia
Colombian track cyclists
South American Games gold medalists for Colombia
South American Games bronze medalists for Colombia
South American Games medalists in cycling
Competitors at the 2010 South American Games
Central American and Caribbean Games gold medalists for Colombia
Central American and Caribbean Games medalists in cycling
Competitors at the 2010 Central American and Caribbean Games
Medalists at the 2011 Pan American Games
20th-century Colombian people
21st-century Colombian people
Competitors at the 2014 Central American and Caribbean Games